The 1961 Japan Series was the Nippon Professional Baseball (NPB) championship series for the 1961 season. It was the 12th Japan Series and featured the Pacific League champions, the Nankai Hawks, against the Central League champions, the Yomiuri Giants.

Summary

Matchups

Game 1
Sunday, October 22, 1961 – 1:00 pm at Osaka Stadium in Osaka, Osaka Prefecture

Game 2
Tuesday, October 24, 1961 – 12:59 pm at Osaka Stadium in Osaka, Osaka Prefecture

Game 3
Thursday, October 26, 1961 – 1:01 pm at Korakuen Stadium in Bunkyō, Tokyo

Game 4
Sunday, October 29, 1961 – 1:00 pm at Korakuen Stadium in Bunkyō, Tokyo

Game 5
Monday, October 30, 1961 – 1:00 pm at Korakuen Stadium in Bunkyō, Tokyo

Game 6
Wednesday, November 1, 1961 – 1:07 pm at Osaka Stadium in Osaka, Osaka Prefecture

See also
1961 World Series

References

Japan Series
Japan Series
Japan Series
Japan Series
Japan Series